There are 12 

city corporations in Bangladesh. Two of them are present in the capital Dhaka. They perform a variety of socio- economic and civic functions.

List of city corporations

List of current mayors 
Political parties

Gallery

Former city corporations
 Dhaka City Corporation (DCC)

See also
 List of municipal corporations in Bangladesh
 List of cities and towns in Bangladesh

References

 
 
Bangladesh, Corporations
Subdivisions of Bangladesh
Bangladesh geography-related lists
Local government-related lists